The 1905 Marshall Thundering Herd football team represented Marshall College (now Marshall University) in the 1905 college football season. Marshall posted a 6–2 record, being outscored by its opposition 43–98. Home games were played on a campus field called "Central Field" which is presently Campus Commons.

Schedule

References

Marshall
Marshall Thundering Herd football seasons
Marshall Thundering Herd football